Dip is a studio album by Scottish musician Aidan Moffat, under his pseudonym L. Pierre. It was released in February 2007 under Melodic Records. The album is a departure from Moffat's earlier work, instead being a collection of sound collages.

Track list

References

2007 albums
Aidan Moffat albums
Sound collage albums